The 2018 Atlantic Coast Conference women's soccer season will be the 30th season of women's varsity soccer in the conference.

The Duke Blue Devils the defending regular season champions.  The North Carolina Tar Heels are the defending ACC tournament Champions.

Changes from 2017 

Pre-Season
 Pittsburgh fired their coach Greg Miller on November 3, 2017.  On December 19, 2017 Randy Waldrum was announced as his replacement.
 Miami fired their coach Mary-Frances Monroe on January 15, 2018, after 5 seasons as head coach. On February 27, 2018 Sarah Barnes was announced as the new head coach.  Barnes was hired from George Washington University.
 Notre Dame's coach Theresa Romagnolo resigned on January 22, 2018, citing the desire to spend more time with her family. Assistant coach Nate Norman was promoted to head coach on February 20, 2018.

Post-Season
 Boston College's coach Allison Foley resigned on December 12, 2018 citing the desire to pursue other opportunities.

Teams

Stadiums and locations 

1.  Georgia Tech does not sponsor women's soccer

Personnel

Pre-season

Hermann Trophy Watchlist
Prior to the season, seven ACC women's soccer players were named to the MAC Hermann Trophy Watchlist.

 Kayla McCoy, Duke
 Deyna Castellanos, Florida State
 Natalia Kuikka, Florida State
 Emina Ekic, Louisville
 Julia Ashley, North Carolina
 Alessia Russo, North Carolina
 Tziarra King, NC State

Pre-season poll
The ACC women's soccer pre-season poll was determined by a vote of all 14 ACC women's soccer head coaches. The poll was voted on as teams began their pre-season training during the first week of August. The coaches also voted on a pre-season all-ACC team.  Results were released on August 6.

Pre-season coaches poll
 North Carolina – 183 (4)
 Florida State – 174 (5)
 Virginia – 173 (2)
 Duke – 151 (3)
 NC State – 144
 Clemson – 120
 Notre Dame – 111
 Wake Forest – 104
 Louisville – 75
 Boston College – 72
 Virginia Tech – 66
 Syracuse – 40
 Miami – 34
 Pittsburgh – 23

First Place Votes shown in 

Source:

Pre-season All-ACC Team

Source:

Regular season

Conference matrix

The table below shows head-to-head results between teams in conference play.  Each team plays 10 matches.  Each team does not play every other team.

Rankings

United Soccer

Top Drawer Soccer

Players of the Week

Postseason

ACC tournament

NCAA tournament

An NCAA record 10 ACC teams were selected to the 2018 Women's Soccer Tournament.  Additionally, two teams received No. 1 seeds and five total teams were seeded.

Awards and honors

All-Americans

ACC Awards

Draft picks

The ACC had 9 players selected in the 2019 NWSL Draft.  This was the most selections in the draft from a single conference.  The ACC had three players selected in the first round, three in the second round and three in the fourth round.

References 

 
2018 NCAA Division I women's soccer season